Vincent J. Hughes (born October 26, 1956) is a Democratic member of the Pennsylvania State Senate, representing the 7th District since 1994. Hughes previously served as a member of the Pennsylvania House of Representatives from the 190th District from 1987 to 1994.

Early life and education
Hughes was born in Philadelphia, Pennsylvania, to James and Ann (née Adams) Hughes. After attending Temple University, he worked as library administrator at the University of Pennsylvania and was an official of District Council 47 of the American Federation of State, County and Municipal Employees.

Career
In 1984, Hughes unsuccessfully ran for the Pennsylvania House of Representatives in the 190th District, losing to longtime incumbent James Barber in the Democratic primary. He challenged Barber again in 1986, and finally won the nomination. In the general election, he defeated his Republican opponent, Sandra R. Kellar, by a margin of 89%-11%. As a member of the State House, he served as chairman the Pennsylvania Legislative Black Caucus from 1991 to 1994.

After Chaka Fattah resigned to run for the U.S. House of Representatives, Hughes was elected to succeed him as State Senator from the 7th District in a special election on November 21, 1994. As a member of the State Senate, he has served as Deputy Minority Whip (2005-2006), Minority Caucus Secretary (2007-2008), Minority Caucus Chair (2009-2010). He was elected Minority Chair of the Appropriations Committee in 2011.

In February 2012, Hughes voted in favor of House Bill 1950. This bill significantly reduces the rights of municipalities to defend themselves against health risks posed by gas drilling.

Hughes is currently the Democratic chair of the Senate Appropriations Committee.

Personal life
Hughes is a trustee of the Mt. Carmel Baptist Church. Hughes met actress, singer, and activist Sheryl Lee Ralph in 2003. The couple married in 2005. Hughes had two children from a previous marriage, as did Ralph.

References

External links
Pennsylvania State Senate - Vincent J. Hughes - Official PA Senate website
Senator Hughes - Caucus website
Vincent Hughes for Senate - Campaign website
Project Vote Smart - Senator Vincent J. Hughes (PA) profile
Follow the Money - Vincent J Hughes
2006 2004 2002 2000 campaign contributions
 Local Journalist Fatimah Ali Dies at 56

1956 births
2012 United States presidential electors
African-American state legislators in Pennsylvania
African-American Christians
Baptists from Pennsylvania
Living people
Democratic Party members of the Pennsylvania House of Representatives
Democratic Party Pennsylvania state senators
Politicians from Philadelphia
Temple University alumni
American Federation of State, County and Municipal Employees people
21st-century African-American politicians
20th-century African-American people